Man's World is the sixth studio album by American hard rock band Mountain, and their first album in over 10 years. It features a cover of the James Brown song "It's a Man's Man's Man's World", from which it takes its title.

Track listing
 "In Your Face" 4:19
 "Nobody Gonna Steal My Thunder" 3:50
 "This Is a Man's World" 3:58
 "So Fine" 3:03
 "Hotel Happiness" 5:21 (Leon Carr/Earl Shuman)
 "I'm Sorry" 3:32
 "I Look" (Power Mix) 3:37
 "Is That Okay?" 3:48
 "Crest of a Slump" 3:32
 "You'll Never Be Alone" 2:11
 "I Look" - Hit Mix (Bonus track) 3:38

Personnel
 Leslie West – guitar, vocals
 Mark Clarke – bass, vocals
 Corky Laing – drums, vocals

with:
 Eddie Black – guitar, background vocals; lead vocals on "I Look"

Additional personnel
 Jim Lewis – executive producer
 Paul Orofino – engineer
 Jean Paul – mastering
 Stephen Jacaruso – art direction
 Ioannis Jacaruso – art direction

References

External links 
MountainMan's World (1996) overview at AllMusic.com

1996 albums
Mountain (band) albums